Auto-brewery syndrome (ABS) (also known as gut fermentation syndrome, endogenous ethanol fermentation or drunkenness disease) is a condition characterized by the fermentation of ingested carbohydrates in the gastrointestinal tract of the body caused by bacteria or fungi. ABS is a rare medical condition in which intoxicating quantities of ethanol are produced through endogenous fermentation within the digestive system. The organisms responsible for ABS include various yeasts and bacteria, including Saccharomyces cerevisiae, S. boulardii, Candida albicans, C. tropicalis, C. krusei, C. glabrata, C. kefyr, C. parapsilosis, Klebsiella pneumoniae, and Enterococcus faecium. These organisms use lactic acid fermentation or mixed acid fermentation pathways to produce an ethanol end product. The ethanol generated from these pathways is absorbed in the small intestine, causing an increase in blood alcohol concentrations that produce the effects of intoxication without the consumption of alcohol.

Researchers speculate the underlying causes of ABS are related to prolonged antibiotic use, poor nutrition and/or diets high in carbohydrates, and to pre-existing conditions such as diabetes and genetic variations that result in improper liver enzyme activity. In the latter case, decreased activity of aldehyde dehydrogenase can result in accumulation of ethanol in the gut, leading to fermentation. Any of these conditions, alone or in combination, could cause ABS, and result in dysbiosis of the microbiome.

Another variant, urinary auto-brewery syndrome, is when the fermentation occurs in the urinary bladder rather than the gut.

Claims of endogenous fermentation have been attempted as a defense against drunk driving charges, some of which have been successful, but the condition is so rare and under-researched they are currently not substantiated by available studies.

Symptoms and signs 
This disease can have profound effects on everyday life. Symptoms that usually accompany ABS include elevated blood alcohol levels as well as symptoms consistent with alcohol intoxication—such as slurred speech, stumbling, loss of motor functions, dizziness, and belching. Mood changes and other neurological problems have also been reported. Several cases in the United States have argued endogenous fermentation as a defense against drunk driving.

Risk factors 
There are certain clinical conditions such as type 2 diabetes mellitus and liver cirrhosis that have been identified to produce higher levels of endogenous ethanol. Research has also shown that Klebsiella bacteria can similarly ferment carbohydrates to alcohol in the gut, which can accelerate non-alcoholic fatty liver disease. Gut fermentation can occur in patients with short bowel syndrome after surgical resection because of fermentation of malabsorbed carbohydrates.

Kaji et al. noticed a correlation between this syndrome and previous abdominal surgeries and disturbances, such as a dilation of the duodenum. Stagnation of the contents ensues, which favors proliferation of the causative organisms.

Gut fermentation syndrome was previously investigated, but eliminated, as a possible cause of sudden infant death syndrome.

Metabolic action 

Fermentation is a biochemical process during which yeast and certain bacteria convert sugars to ethanol, carbon dioxide, as well as other metabolic byproducts. The fermentation pathway involves pyruvate formed from yeast in the EMP pathway, while some bacteria obtain pyruvate through the ED pathway. Pyruvate is then decarboxylated to acetaldehyde in a reaction involving the enzyme pyruvate decarboxylase. Reduction of acetaldehyde to ethanol produces NAD+, which is catalyzed by alcohol dehydrogenase (ADH). ADH rids the body of alcohol through a process called first pass metabolism. However, if the rate of ethanol breakdown is less than the rate of production, intoxication ensues.

Diagnosis
Alcohol levels within the body are usually detected through blood or breath. The best way to identify endogenous ethanol in the bloodstream is through gas chromatography. Gas chromatography is where the breath or blood is heated so that the different components of the vapor or blood separate. The volatiles then pass through a chromatograph that isolates ethanol from the smaller volatiles so that it can be quantified.

More convenient methods include serum measurements and breathalyzers, especially during an acute attack at home. Different countries have different baselines for blood alcohol levels when identifying intoxication through breathalyzers. In the United States, it is 0.08 g/dL.

In diagnosing ABS through serum measurement methods, patients are made to fast in order to establish baseline blood alcohol and blood glucose levels. They are then administered a dose of IG glucose to see if there is an increase in blood alcohol as well as blood sugar. Blood glucose level can be measured with enzyme-amperometric biosensors, as well as with urine test strips. Many of these tests are performed in combination to rule out lab mistakes and alcohol ingestion so that the syndrome is not misdiagnosed.

Treatment
First, patients diagnosed with ABS are treated for the immediate symptoms of alcohol intoxication. Next, patients can take medications if they test positive for the types of fungi or bacteria that cause gut fermentation. For example, antifungals such as fluconazole or micafungin can be prescribed by a physician. Often, probiotics are given concurrently to ensure that the proper bacteria recolonize the gut, and to prevent recolonization by the microorganisms that caused the syndrome. Patients also typically undergo a diet therapy where they are placed on a high protein, low carbohydrate diet to avoid the symptoms of ABS. The treatments listed above can be used individually or in combination to reduce the effects of the syndrome.

Case studies 
 In 2019, a 25-year-old man presented with symptoms consistent with alcohol intoxication, including dizziness, slurred speech and nausea. He had no prior alcoholic drinks but had a blood alcohol level of 0.3 g/dL. The patient was given 100 mg of the antifungal fluconazole daily for 3 weeks, and his symptoms were resolved.
 In 2004, a 44-year-old male was treated with the antibiotics clavulanic acid and amoxicillin for an unrelated condition. Eight days after being discharged, he returned to the emergency room with abdominal pain and belching and was in a state of confusion. An esophagogastroscopy showed the presence of S. cerevisiae and C. albicans in his gastric fluid, causing endogenous ethanol production.
 In 2003, a 13-year-old girl with short gut syndrome suddenly developed symptoms of intoxication after eating a high-carbohydrate meal. She had no access to alcohol any time the symptoms were present. Her small intestine was colonized by two organisms: C. glabrata and S. cerevisiae. She was treated with fluconazole and her symptoms resolved.
 A case of urinary fermentation of carbohydrates by endogenous microorganisms leading to urinary ethanol has been reported. This single reported case is associated with diabetes due to the presence of sugar in the urine for the yeast to ferment. The person did not develop symptoms of intoxication, but did test positive in the urine for alcohol. Fermentation may continue after the urine is expressed, resulting in it developing an odor resembling wine.

References 

Effects of psychoactive drugs
Internal medicine
Rare syndromes
Rare infectious diseases